The Sumukan Limited v Commonwealth Secretariat case was first heard in February 2005 before the internal, administrative tribunal of the Commonwealth Secretariat [CSAT] and on 20 February 2006 an appeal was heard in the Commercial Court of England and Wales before Mr Justice Colman.

Overview
In this lawsuit, the Commonwealth Secretariat is being sued in the UK courts by a British dot com company that claims that the Secretariat has expropriated the company's auction and online tender software.

The Commonwealth Secretariat has in the past relied on its diplomatic immunity to avoid the UK courts (see Mohsin v Commonwealth Secretariat), but since April 2005, a new act, the International Organisations Act 2005 has been passed granting it full immunity in the UK. However the Sumukan case commenced before this came into force.

Case
Sumukan Limited, a London-based dot-com start-up, sued the Commonwealth for expropriating the ownership of its e-commerce software. The British company said it was asked to demonstrate its software to an African government [the government of Namibia] as part of a Commonwealth aid program. The company said it was told that if the government liked the product they would subsequently license it in a three-year deal. It signed a very short consulting agreement for the demonstration for £15,000. The parties fell out because the Secretariat changed internal staff and the new programme office, questioned his predecessor's actions and refused to pay travel expenses and fees for the consulting. Approximately two years later, the Secretariat additionally began to claim ownership of the website developed by the company as well as the software toolkit which Sumukan had used to create its demonstration to the Namibian and South African governments. Sumukan's barrister, Rhodri Thompson QC of Matrix Chambers described the situation thus at the hearing of 20 February 2006: 'Imagine that you have engaged a painter to paint your house. When he has finished painting your house, you decide you own his brushes and ladder'. Sumukan values its software toolkit as worth over several hundreds of thousands of pounds.

Unfortunately for the dotcom company, the diplomatic immunity granted to the Secretariat under the Commonwealth Secretariat Act 1965 meant there was no initial access to the UK courts.

The company was forced to take the matter to an internal tribunal set up by the Commonwealth, all of whose jurists were appointed by the London-born Commonwealth Secretary General Don McKinnon. In February 2005, the three-person panel of Commonwealth jurists found the Commonwealth Secretariat owned all the software used in the demonstration, a decision that UK lawyers have described as 'absurd'.

On 20 February 2006, Sumukan's appeal on a point of law relating to ownership of the software was heard in the UK commercial courts. Justice Colman found that the Commonwealth Secretariat internal tribunal's judgment was indeed open to serious doubt as claimed by the dotcom company. It was also agreed that the matter was one of general public importance. Nevertheless, Justice Colman found that because the Secretariat's internal rules stated that there was no right of appeal from its tribunal [a fact that the company was not aware of when it entered into the consulting agreement], consequently the company was excluded from bringing the matter up in the UK courts. He gave permission to appeal on this point.

Sumukan had argued that the internal rules of the Commonwealth Secretariat, which prevented appeal to the UK courts, combined with the Commonwealth Secretariat Act which granted immunity to the Commonwealth Secretariat was a violation of their Article 6 rights under the European Human Rights Act, namely the right to an independent and impartial court. Sumukan has also claimed that their European Human Rights Act Article 1 Right to the peaceful enjoyment of their property has been violated by the Commonwealth Secretariat.

It was also Justice Colman's view that he did not have substantive jurisdiction [again due to the immunity of the Commonwealth Secretariat] to make any ruling on the substantive points of the case. However he went on to say that the judgment of the Commonwealth Secretariat Arbitral Tribunal was 'open to serious doubt'.

The company also argued that Commonwealth Secretariat Arbitral Tribunal exhibits serious irregularities and is not compliant with the requirements of article 6 of the European Convention on Human Rights, which ensures the right to an independent and impartial tribunal.

Result of Court of Appeal: Failure to comply with proper procedure in appointing an arbitrator rendered the appointment invalid and the award a nullity.

References

External links
 "Power to hear appeal on whether exclusion agreement valid", Times Online
 Sumukan Ltd v Commonwealth Secretariat [2007] EWHC 188 (Comm) (14 February 2007)

Commonwealth Secretariat
English case law
2005 in case law
2006 in case law
2005 in British law
2006 in British law